Barisoni may refer to:

 Albertino Barisoni (died 1667), Roman Catholic Bishop of Ceneda
 Giuseppe Barisoni (1853-1931),  Italian painter and engraver, active in Venice
 Barison, settlement of the City Municipality of Koper, Slovenia